The 1995 edition of the Women's Handball Tournament of the African Games was the 4th, organized by the African Handball Confederation and played under the auspices of the International Handball Federation, the handball sport governing body. The tournament was held, in Harare, Zimbabwe, contested by 7 national teams and won by Angola.

Incident with the Egyptian team
An Egyptian player was accused of being a man and therefore ordered to undergo some tests. In the aftermath, the organization had to apologize to her and her family.

Knockout stage
Championship bracket

Final ranking

Awards

References

External links
 Official website

Handball at the 1995 All-Africa Games
Women's handball in Zimbabwe
1995 in women's handball
Handball at the African Games